The Junin crake or Junin rail (Laterallus jamaicensis tuerosi) is a species of bird in the family Rallidae. It is usually considered a subspecies of the black rail.
The Junín rail is, as suggested by its common name, endemic to marshy habitats around Lake Junín in west-central Peru. It is threatened by habitat loss. The Junin flightless grebe, another highly endangered species, is restricted to the same lake.

References

External links
BirdLife Species Factsheet.
Mongabay: Animal photos of the day: the most elusive bird in the world?

Junin crake
Birds of the Peruvian Andes
Endemic birds of Peru
Junin crake
Taxonomy articles created by Polbot